Studenternas IP is a multi-use stadium in Uppsala, Sweden and the home arena for the football clubs IK Sirius Fotboll on the men's side and IK Uppsala Fotboll on the women's and in bandy for IK Sirius in Elitserien and several other bandy teams. It was inaugurated on 21 March 1909.

The summer arena has a total capacity of 10,522 spectators and the winter arena 4,700. The bandy finals were played here from 1991 until 2012. Starting in 2018, the finals are once again played at Studenternas. The arena has a much bigger capacity during that weekend, for example 25,560 spectators saw the 2010 men's final. The summer arena underwent a major upgrade between 2017 and 2020. 
The "new Studenternas" has a capacity of 10,522 spectators.

Image gallery

References

Football venues in Sweden
Bandy venues in Sweden
Sport in Uppsala
Bandy World Championships stadiums
Swedish Bandy Final venues
Sports venues completed in 1909
1909 establishments in Sweden
American football venues in Sweden